Fews Upper is a barony in County Armagh, Northern Ireland. It lies in the south of the county bordering the Republic of Ireland with its southern and south-western borders. It is bordered by four other baronies in Northern Ireland: Armagh to the west; Fews Lower to the north and west; Orior Lower to the north-west; and Orior Upper to the east. It also borders three baronies in the Republic of Ireland: Cremorne to the west; Dundalk Upper to the south; and Farney to the south-west. Fews Lower and Upper formed the barony of The Fews until it was sub-divided.

Geographical features
The Fews Mountains run through both Fews Lower and Upper, with the range's highest peak, Carrigatuke (also known as Armaghbrague Mountain), standing at 1,200 ft., located in Fews Lower. The County Water and Clarbane River both flow through Fews Upper. The Ballynacarry Bridge crosses the River Fane which is on the border between County Armagh and County Monaghan.

List of settlements
Below is a list of settlements in Fews Upper:

Towns
Crossmaglen

Villages and population centres
Ballsmill
Cullyhanna
Newtownhamilton
Silverbridge
Whitecross

List of civil parishes
Below is a list of civil parishes in Fews Upper:
Ballymyre
Creggan
Lisnadill (split with the barony of Armagh and Fews Lower)
Newtownhamilton

References